The President of the Royal Astronomical Society (prior to 1831 known as President of the Astronomical Society of London) chairs the Council of the Royal Astronomical Society (RAS) and its formal meetings. They also liaise with government organisations (including the Department for Business, Innovation and Skills and the UK Research Councils), similar societies in other countries, and the International Astronomical Union on behalf of the UK astronomy and geophysics communities. Future presidents serve one year as President Elect before succeeding the previous president.

The first president was William Herschel in 1821, though he never chaired a meeting. Since then the post has been held by many distinguished astronomers. The post has generally had a term of office of two years, but some holders resigned after one year e.g. due to poor health. Francis Baily and George Airy were elected a record of four times each. Airy was additionally appointed by Council for a partial term, so served as President a total of five times, more than anyone else. Since 1876 no-one has served for more than two years in total.

Presidents

Further reading

References